Signwriting or sign writing  may refer to:

 The work of the signage profession, see Signwriter
 Sutton SignWriting, a system of writing sign languages